Mosco may refer to the following people:

Given name
Mosco Carner (1904–1985), Austrian-born British musicologist, conductor and critic
Mosco de la Merced I (Juan Domínguez, born 1977), Mexican professional wrestler
Mosco de la Merced II (Juan Valdez, born 1964), Mexican professional wrestler

Surname
Benjamín Mosco (born 1985), Mexican football player
Harry Mosco (d. 2012), the lead vocalist of the Nigerian afro-rock band The Funkees
Maisie Mosco (1924–2011), English writer
Rosemary Mosco, Canadian cartoonist
Steve Mosco, the central figure in The British reggae band Jah Warrior
Umberto Mosco, Italian mathematician 
Mosco convergence in mathematical analysis, discovered by Umberto Mosco

See also

Moscow (disambiguation)